Claude Fichaux (born 24 March 1969) is a retired French football midfielder.

References

1969 births
Living people
French footballers
FC Mulhouse players
Lille OSC players
Le Havre AC players
AS Saint-Étienne players
Le Mans FC players
RC Strasbourg Alsace players
Association football midfielders
Ligue 1 players
Ligue 2 players
French expatriate football managers
Expatriate football managers in Saudi Arabia
French expatriate sportspeople in Saudi Arabia
Al Nassr FC non-playing staff